Karahıdırlı is a village in Erdemli district of Mersin Province, Turkey. It is situated on the southern slopes of Toros Mountains at  The population of the village was 1035. as of 2012.

References 

Villages in Erdemli District